The 2020 Andalusian motorcycle Grand Prix was the third round of the 2020 Grand Prix motorcycle racing season and the second round of the 2020 MotoGP World Championship. It was held at the Circuito de Jerez-Ángel Nieto in Jerez de la Frontera on 26 July 2020. The Grand Prix was introduced as a response to the COVID-19 pandemic. This was Valentino Rossi's final MotoGP podium before he retired.

Background

Impact of the COVID-19 pandemic

The originally scheduled calendar for the 2020 championship was heavily affected by the COVID-19 pandemic. Several Grands Prix were cancelled or postponed after the aborted opening round in Qatar, prompting the Fédération Internationale de Motocyclisme to draft a new calendar. The start of the championship was delayed until 19 July, with the Circuito de Jerez-Ángel Nieto hosting the Spanish Grand Prix as the opening round of the championship.

Organisers of the race signed a contract with Dorna Sports, the sport's commercial rights holder, to host a second round at the circuit on 26 July (a week after the first race) to be known as the Andalusian Grand Prix. The race was named for Andalusia, the autonomous community of Spain that the Circuito de Jerez-Ángel Nieto is located in. The back-to-back Spanish races would mark the first time that a country hosts back-to-back races in the same season.

Race

MotoGP

 Marc Márquez withdrew from the event due to effects of a broken arm suffered at the Spanish Grand Prix.

Moto2

 Jesko Raffin withdrew from the event due to a fatigue syndrome.

Moto3

 Alonso López suffered a heat exhaustion after Friday practice and withdrew from the event.

MotoE

All bikes manufactured by Energica.

Championship standings after the race
Below are the standings for the top five riders, constructors, and teams after the round.

MotoGP

Riders' Championship standings

Constructors' Championship standings

Teams' Championship standings

Moto2

Riders' Championship standings

Constructors' Championship standings

Teams' Championship standings

Moto3

Riders' Championship standings

Constructors' Championship standings

Teams' Championship standings

MotoE

Notes

References

External links

Andalusia
Andalusian motorcycle Grand Prix
Andalusian motorcycle Grand Prix